André Felippe Falbo Ferreira (born November 24, 1964), known as Pampa, is a Brazilian former volleyball player who competed in the 1988 Summer Olympics and in the 1992 Summer Olympics.

In 1988 he was part of the Brazilian team which finished fourth in the Olympic tournament. He played five matches.

Four years later he won the gold medal with the Brazilian team in the 1992 Olympic tournament. He played two matches.

External links
 

1964 births
Living people
Brazilian men's volleyball players
Olympic volleyball players of Brazil
Volleyball players at the 1988 Summer Olympics
Volleyball players at the 1992 Summer Olympics
Olympic gold medalists for Brazil
Olympic medalists in volleyball
Medalists at the 1992 Summer Olympics
Sportspeople from Recife